Henry George Kendall (30 January 1874 – 28 November 1965) was a British sea captain who survived several shipwrecks, including the collision and sinking of the ocean liner Empress of Ireland in 1914 and an attack by a Kaiserliche Marine submarine during the First World War. He was also noted for his role in the capture of murderer Dr. Hawley Harvey Crippen.

Life

Early career
Captain Henry Kendall began his career in sailing ships in 1888 at the age of 14. Eight years later he married Jane "Minnie" Jones. In 1900 he survived a shipwreck on the Newfoundland coast when he was an officer on the SS Lusitania (not the later Cunarder  torpedoed in the First World War). Two years later he worked with Guglielmo Marconi to develop ship-to-shore radio before getting his first command in 1908. Two years after that he was appointed captain of the Canadian Pacific Line's , and within months had become famous following his role in the capture of Dr. Hawley Harvey Crippen, the London cellar murderer, in what was the first use of radio to capture a criminal. Kendall's radio messages alerted Scotland Yard, and Inspector Walter Dew was dispatched to Canada on a faster ship, the White Star Line's , and arrived in Canada before Montrose. Disguised as a pilot, Dew boarded Montrose and arrested Crippen.

Shipwreck of RMS Empress of Ireland
The accident occurred at night. The two ships were head to head when a fog bank rolled onto the river and Storstad changed position, believing Empress of Ireland to be on Storstads port side. This turned the freighter into the side of the larger ship, which was passing on the starboard side. The damage was catastrophic and Empress of Ireland sank in just 14 minutes with the loss of 1,012 people. Kendall was thrown from the bridge when the ship keeled over suddenly but survived. Subsequently he was cleared of any responsibility for the disaster.

Action in the First World War
Soon afterwards he was posted to Antwerp, Belgium, where he was soon in the news again. As the Germans invaded Belgium, the British Consulate in Antwerp was besieged by around 600 refugees.

In March 1918 Calgarian was torpedoed off the Ulster coast by German submarine   but Kendall survived again. He went on to serve as a King's Messenger before being appointed Commodore of Convoys. When the war ended he was appointed Marine Superintendent at Southampton by Canadian Pacific and remained there until he moved to a similar position in London in 1924.

Death
He died in an English nursing home in 1965 at the age of 91. His obituary in The Times made no mention of the sinking of the Empress of Ireland.

Descendants
His grandson was the Anglican priest and hymn writer Canon Michael Saward, and his great grandchildren include F1 journalist Joe Saward and the late anti-rape campaigner Jill Saward.

References

Sources
 David Zeni Forgotten Empress: The Empress of Ireland Story, (Bookcraft, Midsomer Norton, Great Britain: Goose Lane Editions, c1998) .
 James Croall Fourteen Minutes: The Last Voyage of the Empress of Ireland, (Briarcliff Manor, NY: Stein & Day, c1979), 237p., illus. .
 Tom Cullen The Mild Murderer: The True Story of the Dr. Crippen Case, (Boston: Houghton Mifflin Co., 1977), 224p., illus. .
 Jonathan Goodman (Compiler) The Crippen File, (London: Allison & Busby, 1985), 96p. illus.  Pbk.
 Erik Larson Thunderstruck, (New York: Random House, Inc. - Three River Press, 2006), 463p. illus. .
 Joe Saward "The Man who Caught Crippen" (Morienval Press, 2010), 242p. illus. .

1874 births
1965 deaths
People from Chelsea, London
British Merchant Navy officers
Steamship captains